Events commonly referred to as the Gay Mardi Gras include:
Southern Decadence, in New Orleans
Sydney Mardi Gras, in Sydney (formerly known as Sydney Gay and Lesbian Mardi Gras)